Muzej revolucije is the ninth studio album by Bosnian rock band Zabranjeno Pušenje, released through Hayat Production in Bosnia and Herzegovina, Croatia Records in Croatia, Vijesti in Montenegro, and Long Play in Serbia, on November 7, 2009. It was released on the 92nd anniversary of the October Revolution.

Critical reception 

Muzej revolucije received favorable reviews from critics. D. Jagatić of Tportal gave the album an 9 out of 10 album, stating that "all songs on the album have this unique power, specific for the Bosnian humor, and sense of justice". Zoran Tučkar of Muzika.hr gave the album a positive review, stating that it will bring a revolution to the region, to former Yugoslavia, but could, through a harsh and unambiguous critique, encourage young people and young rock bands not to consume the fruits of divine capitalism thinking, but loud and clear they say how things stand.

Track listing
Source: Discogs

Personnel 
Credits adapted from the album's liner notes.

Zabranjeno Pušenje
Sejo Sexon – lead vocals, guitar, backing vocals
Toni Lović – electric guitar, acoustic guitar, backing vocals
Branko Trajkov Trak – drums, percussion, backing vocals
Robert Boldižar – violin, keyboards, backing vocals
Paul Kempf – keyboards 
Dejan Orešković Klo – bass

Additional musicians
Ante Prgin Surka – drums (track 7), trumpet (tracks 4, 7)
Stipe Božinović  Mađor – drums (track 5)
Nenad Mlinarić Mlinka – drums (track 1)

Production
 Sejo Sexon – production
 Toni Lović – sound engineering, programming, audio mixing, production (Studio Plavi Film in Zagreb, Croatia)
 Dario Vitez – executive production
 John Davis – mastering (Metropolis Mastering in London, UK)

Design
Anur Hadžiomerspahić – design and layout (Ideologija Creative Agency in Sarajevo, BIH)
Saša Midžor Sučić – photos

References

2009 albums
Zabranjeno Pušenje albums